A Council of Notables is a political body comprising persons of note in a community who are chosen by the governing authority in the region for their special knowledge, experience, skills, status or accomplishments. Such councils have existed in many regions and countries throughout the world. "Whether in village, province, or capital, there is, a conclave of local authorities of whose opinion the ruler — be it conqueror, governor, or sovereign — is bound to take account, though he is not bound to obey their decisions." 

A Council of Notables was one of many political bodies established by the French in colonial Cameroun between the First and Second World Wars. Each of the colony's nine administrative areas had its own Council. These local government institutions comprised the people whom the French deemed to be the elite of the region. The colonial commissioner chose the members of each council from lists supplied by local officials.

By establishing these bodies, the colonial regime hoped to reign in some of Cameroun's nationalist and pro-independence sentiment. The Councils were expected to uphold and support French policies. Other duties included acting as liaisons between the administration and local populations and alerting the regime as to the status of local projects such as tax collection and the construction of road and rail. In return, the Council members received a cut of taxes collected, exemption from some obligations, and a stipend for supervising road construction.

See also
Council of Elders

Notes

References
DeLancey, Mark W., and DeLancey, Mark Dike (2000): Historical Dictionary of the Republic of Cameroon (3rd ed.). Lanham, Maryland: The Scarecrow Press
Ngoh, Victor Julius (1996): History of Cameroon Since 1800. Limbe: Presbook.

French Cameroon
Government of Cameroon